My Passionate Longing (Swedish: Het är min längtan) is a 1956 Swedish drama film directed by Bengt Logardt and starring Margit Carlqvist, Alf Kjellin and Karl-Arne Holmsten. It was shot at the Sundbyberg Studios of Europa Film in Stockholm. The film's sets were designed by the art director Arne Åkermark.

Cast
 Margit Carlqvist as Nina
 Alf Kjellin as 	Mikael
 Bengt Logardt as 	Hans
 Karl-Arne Holmsten as 	Erik
 Ulla Sjöblom as 	Iris
 Naima Wifstrand as 	Lisa
 Catrin Westerlund as Solveig
 Birgit Rosengren as 	Hotel-Keeper
 Åke Claesson as Nina's Father
 Linnéa Hillberg as Nina's Mother
 Ulla-Bella Fridh as 	Maj-Britt
 Marianne Aminoff as 	Mrs. Grönberg
 Inga Sarri as 	Pregnant girl 
 Henrik Schildt as 	Chief Physician
 Mats Bahr as 	Björn Lilja 
 Lily Berglund as 	Singer 
 Tor Bergner as 	Self 
 Fritiof Billquist as 	Professor 
 Eric Gustafson as 	Malmö Doctor 
 Birgitta Hellerstedt as 	Consuless 
 Willy Koblanck as 	Abortionist 
 Gösta Krantz as 	Chauffeur 
 Hanny Schedin as 	Aunt Valborg 
 Lasse Swärd as 	Radiologist

References

Bibliography 
 Qvist, Per Olov & von Bagh, Peter. Guide to the Cinema of Sweden and Finland. Greenwood Publishing Group, 2000.

External links 
 

1956 films
Swedish drama films
1956 drama films
1950s Swedish-language films
Films directed by Bengt Logardt
Swedish black-and-white films
1950s Swedish films